Yevgeniy Koshevoy (born October 6, 1984) is a Kazakh cross-country skier who has competed since 2001. Competing in two Winter Olympics, he earned his best finish of sixth in the team sprint event at Turin in 2006. He was born in  Kokchetav Oblast.

Koshevoy's best finish at the FIS Nordic World Ski Championships was seventh in the team sprint at Oberstdorf in 2005. He did compete at the 2007 championships in Sapporo, but his records were stripped in wake of being banned from doping prior to the event, serving a two-year suspension from 2007 to 2009.

His best World Cup finish was sixth in the individual sprint at Germany in 2006.

References

1984 births
Cross-country skiers at the 2006 Winter Olympics
Cross-country skiers at the 2010 Winter Olympics
Doping cases in cross-country skiing
Kazakhstani male cross-country skiers
Kazakhstani sportspeople in doping cases
Living people
Olympic cross-country skiers of Kazakhstan
Cross-country skiers at the 2007 Asian Winter Games
Asian Games medalists in cross-country skiing
Medalists at the 2007 Asian Winter Games
Asian Games bronze medalists for Kazakhstan
21st-century Kazakhstani people